The Bluffton Mound Site is a Caddoan Mississippian culture archaeological site in Yell County, Arkansas on the Fourche La Fave River.

Site description

See also
 Spiro Mounds
 List of Mississippian sites

References

External links
 

Caddoan Mississippian culture
Archaeological sites in Arkansas
Mounds in Arkansas
Buildings and structures in Yell County, Arkansas
Fourche La Fave River
Native American history of Arkansas